The 2004 ARFU Asian Rugby Championship was the 19th edition of the tournament, de facto the last complete edition, due to the problems of the 20th edition, scheduled for 2006, but completed only in 2007.

The tournament was played at Hong Kong, and won by Japan.

The team were divided into three divisions, according to the results of the 2003-2004 ARFU Asian Rugby Series.

Tournament

First division ("Cup") 
 Semifinals

Third Place Final

First Place final

Second division ("Plate") 

 Semifinals

Third Place Final

First Place final

Third division ("Bowl")

Note: Pakistan replaced Malaysia.

 Semifinals

Third Place Final

First Place final

References

External links
 HSBC Asian Five Nations Home Page

2004
2004 rugby union tournaments for national teams
International rugby union competitions hosted by Hong Kong
rugby union
2004 in Asian rugby union